Ibrar Tipu is a Bangladeshi music director, composer and singer. He was the composer and one of singer of official theme song for the ICC World Cup Cricket O Prithibi Ebar Ese Bangladesh Nao Chine in 2011. As a singer and musician, he has sung many songs and he can play more than twenty musical instruments. In 2019 he started his own audio-video production house named 'Orni Records' with singer Bindu Kona.

Early life and education 
Tipu grew up in a cultural family in Syedpur. He was enlisted for the Notun Kuri program at Rangpur Radio Station and second in the final competition of tabla in 1985. He was completed music education from Dhaka International Music School.

Career 
Started career as a tabla player Tipu wanted to learn playing more musical instruments and learning to play the guitar back in 1989 from a band named The Blues. He attended Indian classical music classes in 1983–84. First album was released in 1998 and the name of the album 'Kuashar Prohor'. Later released his first solo album 'Chena Ochena' in 2005. He was started singing in movies began in 2007 with a duet with Samina Chowdhury in the movie Tumi Amar Swami.

References 

Living people
Bangladeshi male musicians
Bangladeshi lyricists
21st-century Bangladeshi male singers
21st-century Bangladeshi singers
Year of birth missing (living people)